Sdaw is a 1990 action video game developed by Lankhor. It was created by Fabrice Caillaud, Lionel Caillaud, and Arnaud Dewilde.

Plot 
The world has been destroyed by a global disaster (World War III), and most of the humans have turned into mutants. A few survivors created a perfect robot named S.D.A.W. (System de Defense Anti-Wobblegobbledigook). Players take control of S.D.A.W. and live in sewers. They have been given a mission to clean the area of its unwanted occupants by restraining and disarming them.

Gameplay 
The game's interface consists of a view in the center and action buttons at the bottom of the screen. The player navigates through the sewers by using N, S, E, and W buttons in the bottom-left side of the screen. Other buttons trigger abilities like searching through the player's inventory and examining the surroundings.

Development 
The game has a 16 colour frame rate, and the game world's labyrinth has around 200 screens. The game's use of "mode 2" allowed for graphics that were very difficult to find at the time.

Reception 
The game received an 82% from Amstrad, 60% from Joystick, and Tilt gave it a B.

MicroNews felt that a bit of extra care to the design, for instance in its animations, would have livened up the game.

References 

1990 video games
Action video games
Amstrad CPC games
Amstrad CPC-only games
Europe-exclusive video games
Video games developed in France
Lankhor games